Alsterdorf is a quarter in the Hamburg-Nord borough of the Hamburg, Germany. The name derives from the river Alster and its artificial lakes Außenalster and Binnenalster in the centre of Hamburg. In 2020 the population was 15,227.

History
On 9 March 2023, a mass shooting occurred at a Jehovah's Witnesses center on Deelböge Street, killing seven people including the gunman and injuring eight others.

Geography

The river Alster floating from Northeast to Southwest is the border to the Groß Borstel quarter in the West. In the South Alsterdorf borders to Winterhude quarter. In the East is the Ohlsdorf quarter.

Parts of the large Ohlsdorf Cemetery (Ohlsdorfer Friedhof ) belongs to the quarter Alsterdorf.

Demographics
2006 there were 12,955 people living in Alsterdorf.

In 1999 there were 6,508 households, out of which 15.3% had children under the age of 18 living with them and 54.4% of all households were made up of individuals. The average household size was 1.77.

Population by year 

In 2006 there were 1,283 criminal offences (99 crimes per 1,000 people).

There were 1 elementary school and 2 secondary schools in the quarter Alsterdorf and 30 physicians in private practice and 5 pharmacies.

Politics
These are the results of Alsterdorf in the Hamburg state election:

Sports
Until the opening of O2 World Hamburg in 2002, the Alsterdorfer Sporthalle was the largest indoor sports venue in Hamburg, serving also as a hall for concerts, trade fairs and others.

Transportation

Alsterdorf is serviced by the rapid transit system of the underground railway . According to the Department of Motor Vehicles (Kraftfahrt-Bundesamt), in the quarter were 4,847 private cars registered (377 cars/1000 people).

Notes

References

 Statistical office Hamburg and Schleswig-Holstein Statistisches Amt für Hamburg und Schleswig-Holstein, official website

External links

Quarters of Hamburg
Hamburg-Nord